The 2017–18 LEN Champions League Final Eight is the concluding LEN Champions League tournament of the 2017–18 LEN Champions League season.

Location

Qualified teams

Bracket 

5th–8th place bracket

Quarterfinals

5th–8th place semifinals

Semifinals

Seventh place game

Fifth place game

Third place game

Final

References

External links 

2017–18 LEN Champions League
LEN Champions League Final Eight